
California Shipbuilding Corporation built 467 Liberty and Victory ships during World War II, including Haskell-class attack transports.  California Shipbuilding Corporation was often referred to as Calship.

History
The Calship shipyard was created at Terminal Island in Los Angeles, California, United States as part of America's massive shipbuilding effort of World War II.  W. A. Bechtel Co. was given sponsorship and executive direction of Calship.  As of 1940, Los Angeles shipyards had not built a large ship in 20 years.  By late 1941 though, shipbuilding had become the second largest manufacturing industry in the Los Angeles area.

Calship was created from scratch and began production of Liberty Ships in May 1941. In the early 1940s, contracts from the U.S.Department of Maritime Commission and a number of U.S. Navy contracts led to prosperity shipbuilding business in Los Angeles. The yard was located on 175 acres on the north side of Terminal Island, north of Dock Street, near present-day berths 210-213.  It initially had 8 ways, and later increased this to 14. 40,000 men and women worked under the military contract to construction of 467 vessels over 5 years. The combination of these ships were known as the "Liberty Fleet". These cargo ships were designed for rapid construction with lower costs for them. Thirteen months after commencing production, the yard broke the record by delivering 15 Liberty Ships in June 1942.  It delivered 111 ships in 1942, more than any other yard in the United States.  In June 1943, it broke the record again by delivering 20 ships for the month, and yet again in December 1943, delivering 23 ships.

Large Navy contracts developed shipbuilding in California. As a result of that, many workers migrated to the work area. Many shipyards sprang up from San Francisco to San Diego. At the peak of shipbuilding in California were involved 282 000 persons. Shipbuilding became a highly efficient wartime industry. The building of vessels and the number of jobs in the shipbuilding peaked in mid-1943.

The Kaiser Steel plant in Fontana, California was completed in August 1943, which enabled further production increases at Calship.  Between September 27, 1941 and September 27, 1945, the yard launched 467 ships.

The Calship yard was known as "the city built on invisible stilts."  It was situated on marshy ground, and was built on artificial earth supported by 57,000 piles driven into the mud.  Shipbuilding commenced before the fitting-out docks were even completed.  The yard's workers came from every region of the United States, reaching a force of 40,000 men and women, only 1% of whom had any shipbuilding experience whatsoever.

The Calship Log, aimed at "Calshippers" and "Calshipperettes", was published on the 1st and 15th of each month. The log covered the progress of working for the war effort, safety rules, policies and procedures, as well as leisure activities and information on public transport, gasoline rations, personal tax increases and war bonds. A Victory Edition was published on September 27th, 1945. 

After the war, the Maritime Commission and the Navy department cancelled their contracts with Calship. As the result of that, the level of shipbuilding began to decline. Calship closed in September 1945, after launching the last Victory ship, "four years to the minute after the first slid into the water." Calship ranked 49th among United States corporations in the value of World War II military production contracts. 

In 1947 the Calship facility was taken over by National Metal & Steel Corporation which operated a scrap yard there.  Ironically, 55 of the Liberty and Victory ships that were built at Calship were scrapped on the same site.

The surviving museum ships: SS American Victory and SS Lane Victory, were built in the Calship yard.  The SS American Victory is in Tampa, Florida and the SS Lane Victory is in Los Angeles.  They are open to the public for dockside tours and also sail periodically.

Notable ships

SS Oshkosh Victory
SS Tufts Victory
SS U.S.S.R. Victory
SS Luray Victory
USS Arenac
SS Alamo Victory
USS St. Mary's (APA-126)
SS Carroll Victory
SS Gainesville Victory
SS Joplin Victory
USNS Dalton Victory (T-AK-256)
USS Attala
SS Clara Barton
USS Botetourt
SS Colby Victory
SS Mexico Victory
USS Kenton (APA-122)
SS Sharon Victory
USS Hendry (APA-118)
USS Lanier (APA-125)
USS Hinsdale (APA-120)
USS Kittson (APA-123)
USS Don Marquis (IX-215)
SS Carlos Carrillo
USS Bosque (APA-135)
SS Leland Stanford
USS Betelgeuse (AK-260)
SS Edward Eggleston

See also
Emergency Shipbuilding Program
California during World War II

References

Further reading
Collins, James H. All Aboard! All Aboard! But Where Are the Passengers? Public Utilities Fortnightly, June 24, 1943.
 Herman, Arthur. Freedom's Forge: How American Business Produced Victory in World War II, Random House, New York, NY. .
Nugent, Walter; Ridge, Martin. The American West: The Reader, Indiana University Press, 1999.
Wallace, Jack W.  Calship: An Industrial Achievement, 1941-1945, Jack W. Wallace & Associates, 1947.
Our New West, Popular Mechanics, October 1944.
Shipbuilding: Speed on Terminal Island, Time,  July 13, 1942.

External links
CSUN.edu: California Shipbuilding Corporation Collection
Insidesocal.com: History of the California Shipbuilding Corp.
S.S. American Victory website
S.S. Lane Victory website

Shipbuilding companies of California
Defunct shipbuilding companies of the United States
Manufacturing companies based in Los Angeles
Terminal Island
History of Los Angeles
Los Angeles Harbor Region
Maritime history of California
United States home front during World War II
1940s in California
Bechtel
Henry J. Kaiser
American companies established in 1941
Vehicle manufacturing companies established in 1941
Vehicle manufacturing companies disestablished in 1945
1941 establishments in California
1945 disestablishments in California
20th century in Los Angeles
Defunct manufacturing companies based in Greater Los Angeles
Shipyards in California
Vigor Shipyards